The 1980 African Cup of Nations was the 12th edition of the Africa Cup of Nations, the football championship of Africa (CAF). It was hosted by Nigeria. Just like in 1978, the field of eight teams was split into two groups of four. Nigeria won its first championship, beating Algeria in the final 3−0.

Qualified teams 

The 8 qualified teams are:

 
 
 
  (holders)
 
 
  (host)

Squads

Venues 
The competition was played in two venues in Lagos and Ibadan.

Group stage

Group A

Group B

Knockout phase

Semi-finals

Third place match

Final

CAF Team of the Tournament

Scorers 
3 goals

  Khalid Labied
  Segun Odegbami

2 goals

  Lakhdar Belloumi
  Tedj Bensaoula
  Muda Lawal
  Thuwein Waziri

1 goal

  Salah Assad
  Hocine Benmiloudi
  Mahmoud El Khatib
  Ramadan El Sayed
  Maher Hammam
  Mokhtar Mokhtar
  Mosaad Nour
  Hassan Shehata
  Willie Klutse
  Moussa Camara
  Ibrahima Diawara
  Sidouba Bangoura.
  Ani Gome
  Kouman Kobenan
  Tahir Mustapha
  Okey Isima
  Ifeanyi Onyedika
  Felix Owolabi
  Juma Mkambi

External links 
 Details at RSSSF

 
Nations
International association football competitions hosted by Nigeria
Africa
Africa Cup of Nations tournaments
African Cup of Nations